Croaghgorm or Bluestack is a  mountain in County Donegal, Ireland. It is the highest of the Blue Stack Mountains (or Croaghgorms) and the third-highest mountain in County Donegal.

On 31 January 1944, during World War II, a Royal Air Force (RAF) Sunderland plane crashed on the mountain. Seven RAF crewmen from 228 Squadron were killed. Wreckage from the plane can still be seen on the mountain's slopes. A memorial plaque was unveiled in 1988.

See also
List of mountains in Ireland

References

Hewitts of Ireland
Marilyns of Ireland
Mountains and hills of County Donegal
Mountains under 1000 metres
Aviation accidents and incidents in Ireland